Auguste Pitte (10 June 1907 – 10 November 1963) was a French racing cyclist. He rode in the 1932 Tour de France.

References

1907 births
1963 deaths
French male cyclists
Place of birth missing